Pityobiinae is a subfamily of click beetles in the family Elateridae. There are at least two genera and two described species in Pityobiinae.

Genera
These two genera belong to the subfamily Pityobiinae:
 Pityobius Leconte, 1854
 Tibionema Solier, 1851

References

Further reading

 

Elateridae